Glenn MacKay (born August 27, 1984) is a professional Canadian football wide receiver. He signed as an undrafted free agent with the Montreal Alouettes in 2009 before signing with Hamilton on June 15, 2010. He has also played for the Edmonton Eskimos. He played CIS football for the Windsor Lancers.

References

External links
Hamilton Tiger-Cats bio

1984 births
Living people
Windsor Lancers football players
American football wide receivers
Canadian expatriate sportspeople in Germany
Canadian football wide receivers
Edmonton Elks players
Hamilton Tiger-Cats players
Montreal Alouettes players
Players of Canadian football from Ontario
Sportspeople from Burlington, Ontario